Palomar College is a public community college in San Diego County, California.  The main campus is in San Marcos and three centers and four education sites are located elsewhere throughout north San Diego County. The largest of these by student population is the education center located in Escondido. In 2018, education centers in Rancho Bernardo and Fallbrook opened. The Rancho Bernardo Education Center is located on 27 acres at 11111 Rancho Bernardo Road, and the Fallbrook Education Center is located on 81 acres at 35090 Horse Ranch Creek Road. Other education sites are located at Camp Pendleton and at Ramona High School.

Academics

Palomar College offers 250 associate's degrees and certificate programs, and also offers programs for students wishing to transfer to many different four-year universities, including institutions in the University of California and California State University systems. These programs are organized into five academic divisions:
Arts, Media, Business Administration
Career, Technical and Extended Education
Languages and Literature
Mathematics and The Natural and Health Sciences
Social and Behavioral Sciences

In addition, Palomar College and other local adult schools in North County work collaboratively to leverage services and resources to better serve adult education students in the areas of Adult Basic Education, ESL, GED, HISET, high school diploma, and post-secondary education and vocational training. Palomar College is the lead member of the Education to Career Network of North San Diego County. ETCN is one of 71 Consortiums in the State of California and is funded by the California Adult Education Program. Members of the ETCN Consortium are: Escondido Adult School, Palomar College, Poway Adult School, Ramona Adult School, San Marcos Adult School, and Vista Adult School.

Media
 IMPACT, lifestyle magazine
 KKSM, radio
 PCTV (shares airtime with ITV Cable 16), television
 The Telescope, college newspaper

Associated Student Government
The Governing Board of the Palomar Community College District has authorized the students of the District to organize a student body association named "Associated Students of the Palomar Community College District". The association is required by law to "encourage students to participate in the governance of the college".

The governing body of the association is named "Associated Student Government" (ASG). The ASG is a student-run organization at Palomar that strives to create a better campus for its students. Members of the ASG serve on campus-wide shared-governance committees and hiring committees, lobby State and Federal representatives on student issues, attend leadership conferences, and are responsible for Comet Week, Springfest, and some campus-wide activities.  Members of the ASG have opportunities to attend conferences, special on-campus parking, and serve on campus-wide committees as the "voice of the students."

The Associated Students periodically participates in meetings sponsored by a statewide community college student organization named Student Senate for California Community Colleges. The statewide Student Senate is authorized by law "to advocate before the Legislature and other state and local governmental entities".

Athletics
The intercollegiate athletic program at Palomar College consists of a combined 22 men's and women's sports teams, averaging over 450 participating student-athletes per year. Men's and women's sports include basketball, volleyball, tennis, soccer, swimming, water polo, and cross country. Other Sports are football, baseball, softball, golf, wrestling, track and field.

Notable alumni
Todd Bankhead – professional football player
Joey Beltran – professional mixed martial artist for Bellator Fighting Championships, formerly fighting for King of the Cage, Strikeforce, and UFC
Ken Block – Rally Car driver, and founder of DC Shoes
Travis Browne –  professional MMA fighter, current UFC heavyweight contender, played basketball for Palomar
Matt Chico – professional baseball player
Tom Dempsey – professional football player best known for his then-record 63-yard field goal with the New Orleans Saints
Ryan Dahl - software engineer, inventor of Node.js
Pita Elisara – professional football player
Lina Fanene – professional wrestler for WWE and plus-sized model
Saalim Hakim – professional football player
Tim Hill (attended) – professional baseball player
James Hoyt – professional baseball player
Candi Kubeck – captain of ValuJet Flight 592, which crashed into the Florida Everglades on May 11, 1996.
Bobby Lee (attended) – comedian and actor
Tommy Lister Jr. - Actor and former professional wrestler
Tom Luginbill – college football quarterback and college football analyst for ESPN
Brett Salisbury – college football quarterback and author of the Transform Diet
Robert Stromberg - Oscar-winning art director, production designer, special effects artist, and filmmaker
Jesse Taylor (attended) – Junior College State Champion in 2004; current professional MMA fighter, two-time Ultimate Fighter Finalist, UFC Ultimate Fighter: Redemption Season Champion 
Kenbrell Thompkins (attended) – professional football player
Nick Vincent (born 1986) - professional baseball player

Notable faculty
Dorian "Doc" Paskowitz (1921–2014), surfer and physician

References

External links
Official website

California Community Colleges
Universities and colleges in San Diego County, California
Education in San Marcos, California
North County (San Diego County)
Educational institutions established in 1946
1946 establishments in California
Schools accredited by the Western Association of Schools and Colleges
Two-year colleges in the United States